Lotorps IF is a sports club in Lotorp, Sweden, established on 15 March 1923. The women's bandy team has played three seasons in the Swedish top division. The women's soccer team played three seasons in the Swedish top division between 1978 and 1997.

References

External links
Official website 

1923 establishments in Sweden
Football clubs in Östergötland County
Association football clubs established in 1923
Bandy clubs established in 1923
Defunct bandy clubs in Sweden
Ski clubs in Sweden
Sport in Östergötland County